David Luneau (born February 11, 1965) is a current member of the New Hampshire House of Representatives, one of the three members representing the Merrimack 10th District, Hopkinton and Concord, since 2014. He resides in Hopkinton and had served on the Hopkinton School Board from 2007 until 2019. He served as chairman of the board from 2007 to 2016. He also serves on the advisory board for NHTI, Concord's Community College, and on the industrial advisory board for the University of New Hampshire at Manchester.

References

External links

The New Hampshire House of Representatives - David Luneau

School board members in New Hampshire
Democratic Party members of the New Hampshire House of Representatives
Living people
1965 births
People from Hopkinton, New Hampshire
21st-century American politicians